John Joseph Trait (1859–1906), was an Australian rules umpire and is considered to be the best umpire of the code from the 19th century.

Victorian Football Association umpire 
Trait umpired his first game on 22 July 1882 in Geelong in a match between the local side and South Melbourne. Despite the travelling side losing, their captain Mat Minchin congratulated John Trait after the match saying "You are the best umpire we ever had at Geelong".

Trait was considered one of the best umpires in the Victorian Football Association, and was known as "The Prince of Umpires".

Demand in other states 
Trait was regularly in demand from other states for use in important matches. He was specifically sought out and used as the umpire for the 1889 SAFA Grand Final.

Umpire of intercolonial matches 
Trait would regularly be selected as the umpire of matches between Victoria and South Australia.

Retirement from umpiring 
He retired from umpiring in 1895.

References

Australian Football League umpires
1859 births
1906 deaths